Holmside is a village in County Durham, in England. It is situated to the north-west of Sacriston.

References 

Villages in County Durham